Weibin may refer to:

Weibin District, Xinxiang (卫滨区), Henan
Weibin District, Baoji (渭滨区), Shaanxi